The Grammy Award for Best Instrumental Arrangement (and its subsequent name changes) has been awarded since 1963.  The award is presented to the arranger(s) of the music. Only songs or tracks are eligible, no longer works (e.g. albums). The performing artist does not receive a Grammy, except if he/she is also the arranger.

There have been several minor changes to the name of the award:

From 1963 to 1981 the award was known as Best Instrumental Arrangement
From 1982 to 1983 it was awarded as  Best Arrangement on an Instrumental Recording  
From 1984 to 1994 it was awarded as Best Arrangement on an Instrumental
From 1995 to 2014 it was again awarded as Best Instrumental Arrangement  
From 2015 it has been awarded as Best Arrangement, Instrumental or A Cappella, which also includes vocal arrangements for a cappella performances.

Years reflect the year in which the Grammy Awards were presented, for works released in the previous year.

Recipients

Multiple wins

References 

Instrumental Arrangement